In the Church of Jesus Christ of Latter-day Saints (LDS Church), the Quorum of the Twelve Apostles (also known as the Quorum of the Twelve, the Council of the Twelve Apostles, or simply the Twelve) is one of the governing bodies in the church hierarchy. The quorum was first organized in 1835 and designated as a body of "traveling councilors".  The following are the current and previous members of the Quorum of the Twelve Apostles in the LDS Church.

List notes
This list only includes individuals who have served in the Quorum.  This list is organized by current Quorum members, original Quorum members, then by date of appointment to the Quorum, and then by last name.  Members of the First Presidency, which include the President of the Church and his counselors, are usually not part of the Quorum, and a calling to the First Presidency usually entails leaving the Quorum. Exceptions to this rule are noted. It is also possible to be ordained to the priesthood office of Apostle without automatic membership in the Quorum of the Twelve, or to serve in the First Presidency without having been ordained an Apostle. Such individuals who never became members of the Quorum do not appear in the last section of this page.

The begin and end dates represent when an individual first joined (typically corresponding to an ordination date) and last belonged to the Quorum.  Strictly speaking, members of the First Presidency rejoin the Quorum temporarily when a Church President dies, and before a successor is named.  For simplicity, this list does not consider these periods in determining the end date.  On occasion, a quorum member has left the Quorum for a time and later rejoined it; this is noted where applicable.

Additional positions held appears with each member, including, Counselor in the First Presidency ("First Counselor," etc.), President of the Quorum of the Twelve Apostles ("Quorum President"), Acting President of the Quorum of the Twelve Apostles ("Acting Quorum President"), President of The Church of Jesus Christ of Latter-day Saints ("Church President"), and Assistant to the Quorum of the Twelve. A Quorum President is not a member of the Quorum if he is serving in the First Presidency. In those circumstances, an Acting President is typically called, as noted.

Current Quorum of the Twelve Apostles

Members of the original Quorum of the Twelve Apostles

19th century

20th century

21st century

Apostles who were never members of the Quorum of the Twelve
The following men were ordained to the priesthood office of apostle but were never members of the Quorum of the Twelve Apostles.  Some, but not all, served in the First Presidency of the LDS Church.

J. Reuben Clark
In addition, J. Reuben Clark was only a member of the Quorum of the Twelve for one week in 1945 and six days in 1951, which were periods of time when the First Presidency was dissolved due to the death of the President of the Church.

See also

Chronology of the First Presidency (LDS Church)
Chronology of the Quorum of the Twelve Apostles (LDS Church)
List of presidents of the Church of Jesus Christ of Latter-day Saints
Apostolic succession (LDS Church)

References

List
Latter Day Saint movement lists
Quorum of the Twelve Apostles (LDS Church)
Quorum of the Twelve Apostles